Gujjarpur Kalan is a village in Shaheed Bhagat Singh Nagar district of Punjab State, India. The village is administrated by Sarpanch an elected representative of the village.

Demography 
As of 2011, Gujjarpur Kalan has a total number of 176 houses and population of 840 of which 416 include are males while 424 are females according to the report published by Census India in 2011. The literacy rate of Gujjarpur Kalan is 74.29%, lower than the state average of 75.84%. The population of children under the age of 6 years is 101 which is 12.02% of total population of Gujjarpur Kalan, and child sex ratio is approximately 906 as compared to Punjab state average of 846.

Most of the people are from Schedule Caste which constitutes 77.26% of total population in Gujjarpur Kalan. The town does not have any Schedule Tribe population so far.

As per the report published by Census India in 2011, 248 people were engaged in work activities out of the total population of Gujjarpur Kalan which includes 228 males and 20 females. According to census survey report 2011, 98.39% workers describe their work as main work and 1.61% workers are involved in Marginal activity providing livelihood for less than 6 months.

Education 
The village has a Punjabi medium, co-ed primary school founded in 1953. The schools does not provide mid-day meal. The school provide free education to children between the ages of 6 and 14 as per Right of Children to Free and Compulsory Education Act. KC Engineering College and Doaba Khalsa Trust Group Of Institutions are the nearest colleges.

Transport 

See also 
List of villages in India

References

External links 
 Tourism of Punjab
 Census of Punjab
 Locality Based PINCode

Villages in Shaheed Bhagat Singh Nagar district